Sir George Smith Clark, 1st Baronet, DL (8 November 1861 – 23 March 1935) was a businessman and politician in Northern Ireland.  George S. Clark was born in Paisley, Scotland the second son of thread manufacturer James Clark, and Jane Smith; both his parents were Scottish Presbyterians.

Early life
Clark was educated at Merchiston Castle School, Edinburgh. He was apprenticed to Harland and Wolff in Belfast and, in 1877, opened his own shipyard on the river Lagan with Frank Workman.  Clark's mother's brother, George Smith, was able to provide capital for this initial venture. In 1891 the firm became Workman, Clark and Company. During the First World War the shipyard concentrated on Admiralty work and it was for this that, in 1917, Clark received the Baronetcy of Dunlambert.

Personal life
In 1881 Clark married Frances Matier, and became a director of her family's linen firm; Henry Matier & Co. The couple had two sons. The family hosted computing pioneer Dora Metcalf in Belfast when she was introducing comptometery machines into the shipyards in 1916.

A leading Belfast Unionist
In a 1907 by-election he became Member of Parliament for North Belfast, retiring in 1910 to devote more attention to his business affairs.  In 1913 the Workman Clark shipyard had assisted the UVF with the Larne gun running campaign encouraged by Sir Edward Carson. In 1925 Clark became a Unionist Senator in the Northern Ireland parliament. He remained in this position until his death at his home, Dunlambert, Fortwilliam Park, Belfast, on 23 March 1935. He also served as a Deputy Lieutenant and director of the Bank of Ireland.

Death and legacy
He was buried on 26 March in Belfast City Cemetery.  The virtues of company law are such that despite the ruin of Workman, Clark & Co. Ltd.  Sir George died a millionaire.

Upon his death his son, Sir George Clark, 2nd Baronet, succeeded to the baronetcy; he was a Cambridge-educated naval architect and soldier (d. 1950).

Arms

References

Bibliography
 The Peerage.com

External links 
 

1861 births
1935 deaths
Baronets in the Baronetage of the United Kingdom
Deputy Lieutenants of Belfast
Politicians from Edinburgh
Members of the Senate of Northern Ireland 1925–1929
Members of the Senate of Northern Ireland 1929–1933
Members of the Senate of Northern Ireland 1933–1937
People educated at Merchiston Castle School
Businesspeople from Northern Ireland
Ulster Unionist Party members of the Senate of Northern Ireland
Members of the Parliament of the United Kingdom for Belfast constituencies (1801–1922)
UK MPs 1906–1910
Irish Unionist Party MPs
Burials at Belfast City Cemetery